= Cajuru Park =

Park in Curitiba, Brazil

Coordinates: 25°27′35.0″S 49°11′36.7″W

The Cajuru Linear Park (Brazilian Portuguese: Parque Linear do Cajuru), known simply as the Cajuru Park, is a park located in Curitiba, state of Paraná, Brazil.
